Parava may refer to:

 Kunaparaju Parava, a village in Reddigudem Md, Krishna District, A.P., India
Parava, Iran, a village in Hormozgan Province, Iran
Paravas, a Tamil caste
Parava, Bacău, a commune in Romania
Parava (film)
Parava, a defunct ICANN Registrar